In Mandaeism, Yawar Ziwa (also known as Yawar Kasia  "Hidden Yawar", or Yawar Rabba  "Great Yawar") is an uthra (angel or guardian) from the World of Light. He is the personification of light.

Simat Hayyi, the personification of life, is the wife of Yawar Ziwa.

Etymology
E. S. Drower translates Yawar Ziwa as "Dazzling Radiance", although Mark Lidzbarski translates Yawar as "helper."

In the Ginza Rabba
Book 14 of the Right Ginza mentions Yawar as one of the first uthras to have been created, along with Yushamin.

Yawar is identified in Right Ginza 15.8 as "the first Gupna."

As an epithet
Yawar Ziwa is also an epithet for several figures in Mandaean scripture, including:
Abatur
Hibil Ziwa
Manda d-Hayyi

See also
 List of angels in theology

References

Uthras
Light and religion
Individual angels
Personifications in Mandaeism